Jovan Lukić (born 20 January 2002) is a Serbian football central midfielder who plays for S.C.U. Torreense on loan from LASK.

Career
On 12 January 2023, Lukić signed for LASK on a long-term contract, joining S.C.U. Torreense on loan until the end of the season.

References

External links
 
 

2002 births
Sportspeople from Valjevo
Living people
Association football midfielders
Serbian footballers
Serbia youth international footballers
Serbia under-21 international footballers
FK Čukarički players
LASK players
S.C.U. Torreense players
Serbian SuperLiga players
Liga Portugal 2 players
Serbian expatriate footballers
Expatriate footballers in Austria
Serbian expatriate sportspeople in Austria
Expatriate footballers in Portugal
Serbian expatriate sportspeople in Portugal